13184 Augeias  is a Jupiter trojan from the Greek camp, approximately  in diameter. It was discovered by Belgian astronomer Eric Elst at ESO's La Silla Observatory in northern Chile on 4 October 1996. The dark Jovian asteroid has a rotation period of 11.9 hours. It was named after Augeas from Greek mythology.

Orbit and classification 

Augeias is a dark Jovian asteroid in a 1:1 orbital resonance with Jupiter. It is located in the leading Greek camp at the Gas Giant's  Lagrangian point, 60° ahead of its orbit . It is also a non-family asteroid in the Jovian background population. It orbits the Sun at a distance of 4.9–5.4 AU once every 11 years and 9 months (4,288 days; semi-major axis of 5.17 AU). Its orbit has an eccentricity of 0.05 and an inclination of 5° with respect to the ecliptic.

Naming 

This minor planet was named from Greek mythology after King Augeas, father of Epicaste. The fifth Labour of Heracles was to clean the king's stables. Heracles solved the difficult and humiliating feat by rerouting two rivers to wash out the enormous amount of dung. The official naming citation was published by the Minor Planet Center on 6 January 2003.

Physical characteristics 

Augeias is an assumed C-type asteroid, while most larger Jupiter trojans are D-types.

Rotation period 

A first rotational lightcurve of Augeias was obtained from by Linda French and Lawrence Wasserman in April 2014. Lightcurve analysis gave a tentative rotation period of  hours with a brightness amplitude of 0.15 magnitude. In August 2015, photometric observations by the Kepler space telescope during its K2 mission determined a refined period of  hours with a brightness variation of 0.15 magnitude. One week later, a second, lower-rated lightcurve by Kepler gave a concurring period of  hours with an amplitude of 0.16.

Diameter and albedo 

According to the survey carried out by the NEOWISE mission of NASA's Wide-field Infrared Survey Explorer, Augeias measures 33.96 kilometers in diameter and its surface has an albedo of 0.067, while the Collaborative Asteroid Lightcurve Link assumes a standard albedo for a carbonaceous asteroid of 0.057 and calculates a diameter of 35.12 kilometers based on an absolute magnitude of 11.0.

References

External links 
 Asteroid Lightcurve Database (LCDB), query form (info )
 Dictionary of Minor Planet Names, Google books
 Discovery Circumstances: Numbered Minor Planets (10001)-(15000) – Minor Planet Center
 Asteroid 13184 Augeias at the Small Bodies Data Ferret
 
 

013184
Discoveries by Eric Walter Elst
Named minor planets
19961004